Nila volcano forms completely an isolated 5 × 6 km wide of island with the same name in the Barat Daya Islands of the Banda Sea, Indonesia. The volcano comprises a low caldera with its rims breach into the sea surface on the south and the east side. The dominantly andesitic volcano contains a young forested cone at the elevation of 781 m height.

Mount Nila is a stratovolcano, and caused the abandonment of a Rumadai village when it erupted in 1968.

See also 

 List of volcanoes in Indonesia

References 

Volcanoes of the Lesser Sunda Islands
Stratovolcanoes of Indonesia
Calderas of Indonesia
Active volcanoes of Indonesia
Barat Daya Islands
Islands of the Maluku Islands
Holocene stratovolcanoes